Elinore Johansson (born 19 March 1996) is a Swedish handball player who plays for Storhamar HE in the Norwegian REMA 1000-ligaen and the Swedish national team.

She also represented Sweden in the 2013 European Women's U-17 Handball Championship in Poland, where the Swedish team won the final tournament, and at the 2015 Women's U-19 European Handball Championship in Spain, receiving the bronze medal.

She made her debut on the Swedish national team on 16 June 2018, against Ukraine.

On 8 February 2021, it was announced that she had signed a 3-year contract with Storhamar HE in Norway.

Achievements 
Svensk handbollselit:
Silver Medalist: 2012, 2013
Norwegian League
Silver Medalist: 2021/2022

References

1996 births
Living people
Swedish female handball players
People from Hässleholm Municipality
Swedish expatriate sportspeople in Norway
Sportspeople from Skåne County
21st-century Swedish women